Corbehem is a commune in the Pas-de-Calais department in the Hauts-de-France region of France.

Geography
A farming and light industrial village located 17 miles (27 km) northeast of Arras on the D45 road. The Scarpe river flows through the commune.

Population

Places of interest
 The church of Notre-Dame, rebuilt in the 20th century.
 The chateau.
 The Commonwealth War Graves Commission cemetery.

See also
Communes of the Pas-de-Calais department

References

External links

 The CWGC graves in Corbehem cemetery

Communes of Pas-de-Calais